Collins Aerospace is an American technology corporation that is one of the world's largest suppliers of aerospace and defense products. Headquartered in Charlotte, North Carolina, it is a subsidiary of Raytheon Technologies.

History 

On November 26, 2018, United Technologies announced the completion of its Rockwell Collins acquisition, after which it merged its newly acquired business with UTC Aerospace Systems to form Collins Aerospace. This acquisition controversially led to multiple class action lawsuits being filed against the company alleging that the executives deliberately misled its shareholders on the nature of the acquisition. 

The new company reported $26 billion of combined sales in 2019 and is composed of 68,000 employees. In 2020 United Technologies merged with Raytheon Company to form Raytheon Technologies.

Products
Collins Aerospace is engaged in designing, manufacturing and servicing systems and components for commercial aviation, business aviation, military and defense, helicopters, space, airports, and other industries.

Collins Aerospace has six strategic business units: Aerostructures, Avionics, Interiors, Mechanical Systems, Missions Systems, and Power & Controls.

Aerostructures
Based in Chula Vista, California, Aerostructures includes nacelle systems, flight control surfaces, naval composites and other material and structural components.

Avionics
Based in Cedar Rapids, Iowa, Avionics includes commercial and government avionics systems, cabin management and content systems, information management systems and services, fire protection services, and aircraft sensors.

Interiors
Based in Winston-Salem, North Carolina, Interiors includes aircraft seating, interior systems, evacuation systems, galleys and galley inserts, lavatories, life rafts, lighting; veneers, potable water systems, and de- icing products.

Mechanical Systems
Based in Charlotte, North Carolina, Mechanical Systems includes landing systems, actuation, propellers, flight controls, pilot controls, hoist and winch systems, and cargo systems.

Missions Systems
Based in Cedar Rapids, Iowa, Mission Systems includes secure military communication, navigation and guidance; missile actuation; simulation, training and range instrumentation; strategic command and control; unmanned aircraft systems; electronic warfare; ejection seats and propulsion; intelligence, surveillance and reconnaissance; and spacecraft systems.

Power & Controls
Based in Windsor Locks, Connecticut, Power & Controls includes electric systems, engine controls, air management, and airframe controls.

Ithaco Space Systems, Inc. 

Collins Aerospace is the owner of Ithaco Space Systems, Inc., formerly owned by Goodrich Company and its successor UTC Aerospace Systems. Ithaco has produced items for the field of satellite control since 1962, such as Earth sensors, reaction/momentum wheels, magnetometers, and magnetic torquers.

In addition to over 100 U.S. satellites, equipment made by Ithaco has flown on Japanese, Canadian, French, German, Spanish, Swedish, and Argentinean spacecraft. Ithaco became notable for having manufactured the reaction wheels of the Kepler spacecraft, the Hayabusa spacecraft, the Mesosphere Energetics and Dynamics (TIMED) satellite, and the Dawn spacecraft, which developed problems or even failed.

FlightAware 
On August 20, 2021, Collins Aerospace announced the acquisition of FlightAware for an undisclosed amount. FlightAware is a technology company that provides real-time, historical, and predictive flight data and flight-tracking products.

Employment controversies 

In August 2018, Nicole Kemp sued Collins Aerospace alleging that the company had discriminated, harassed, and retaliated against her on the basis of her disability. Nicole Kemp ruptured her hamstring in 2017 and was subsequently diagnosed with chronic regional pain syndrome. Kemp was initially allowed to work from home on the recommendation of her doctors, but was told in May 2018 that she would have to resign or be terminated from the company if she didn't return to the office- despite the fact that she had exemplary job performance reviews, and her physicians were still recommending that she work remotely as her injuries were still too great. 

In November 2019, a former Collins Aerospace employee sued the company after being sexually assaulted by a different Collins Aerospace employee while they were at a conference.

In March 2020, a Collins Aerospace employee sued the company for discrimination and harassment based on her race and national origin.

In May 2020, a Collins Aerospace engineer sued the company alleging that she was demoted on the basis on discrimination of her sex and disabilities.

In July 2020, it was found that female Collins Aerospace (then Rockwell Collins) employees were being paid substantially less money than their male peers who held similar roles. As a result, the company was forced to pay $250,000 in back wages to 76 female employees at its Cedar Rapids location.  

In January 2022, Collins Aerospace was included in a legal challenge alleging that the company engaged in a "no hire agreement" to sabotage the career and pay advancements of its engineers. This occurred shortly after a different Raytheon Technologies subsidiary, Pratt-Whitney, was sued for engaging in similar practices of not hiring from within the industry in order to keep employee's salaries low.

See also
 List of aircraft propeller manufacturers
 LucasVarity
 Pratt & Whitney

References

External links
 Collins Aerospace website
 UTC Aerospace Systems website

Aerospace companies of the United States
United Technologies
Windsor Locks, Connecticut
Aircraft propeller manufacturers
Manufacturing companies based in North Carolina
Companies based in Charlotte, North Carolina
West Palm Beach, Florida
Manufacturing companies established in 2012
American companies established in 2012
Raytheon Technologies
Aircraft undercarriage manufacturers